Puyan Township is a rural township in Changhua County, Taiwan.

History
Puyan used to be a barren plain inhabited by the Babuza people dwellers who arrived from Quanzhou, Fujian around 300 years ago.

Geography
The township has an area of 38.61 km2 consisting of 22 villages, 262 neighborhoods and 8,452 households with a total population of 31,380 people. Around 87.8% of its total area is arable land. The township is located in central Changhua County.

Administrative divisions
The township comprises 22 villages: Buzi, Chushui, Dalian, Dayou, Fengze, Haoxiu, Jiaoshu, Kunlun, Nangang, Nanxin, Punan, Puyan, Sanxing, Shibei, Taiping, Tiancheng, Wayao, Xihu, Xinxing, Xinshui, Yongle and Yongping.

Economy
Vegetable and glutinous rice planting are the main plantation in the township. Its milled long-grain glutinous rice accounts for 27% of the total production in Taiwan. Other produces are broccoli, leeks, spring onions, peas, cucumbers, bitter gourds, squashes and water chestnuts. Its livestock industry is also quite developed, in which most of the livestock are pigs and chickens, with additional cattle, sheep, deer and rabbits.

Commercial business is dominated by traditional shops. Small and medium enterprises or family-owned business operate in the production of parts and components of bikes, plywood, plastic processing or original equipment manufacturer.

Tourist attractions
 Chang Sheng Echeveria Peacockii Farm
 Cisinglun and Rihyue Pool
 Lushan Taoist Temple
Puyan Shunze Temple
 Tian Jhuang Echeveria Peacockii Farm

Transportation
Puyan System Interchange, spider web of freeway no. 1 and expressway no. 76.

References

External links

 Puyan Township Office, Changhua County

Townships in Changhua County